The Alley Cats are an American doo-wop group singing in a cappella.

The group originated in 1987, when a concert choir program was having a variety night occurring at Fullerton College. When John Tebay, the choir director, suggested that Andre Peek (1st tenor and lead vocalist at that time) and Armando Fonseca (2nd tenor)  perform together, both of them decided to take Mr. Tebays advice and form a quartet, an a cappella group. Two additional members along the way, Royce Reynolds (bass) and Todd Dixon (baritone)got together and the foursome gained notice.  Since then The Alley Cats have performed for many audiences, ranging from elementary school fun nights to being Grand.prize.winners on the Gong Show. Performing on the Arsenio Hall show to The Tonight Show with Jay Leno, as well as opening for Leno at his Las Vegas shows.  The Alley Cats's sound has been heard as well at The White House. The Alley Cats appeared in the Richard Simmons workout video Dance Your Pants Off! performed the song Celebration.

The Alley Cats have won two Contemporary A Cappella Society awards: one for best album (The Doo-Wop Drive-In Live) and one for best song ("What's Your Name").

Members

Armando "Mando" Fonseca
Royce "The Voice" Reynolds
Andre Peek
Todd Dixon
Adam Bastien
Jeremy Bernard
Brandon Brigham
Brian Brigham
Terron Brooks
Juan Del Castillo
Chris Chatham
Michael Cordero, Jr
Sean Devine
Toby Donnelly
Adam Ellis
Josh Elmore
Todd Fournier
Tim Foust
Evan Michael Garry
Phil Gold
Jeff Grider
Grant Hendrickson
Chris Kauffmann
Jeffrey Landman
Rick Mallory
Tonoccus McClain
Mark Miserrochi
John O'Campo
Henry O'Neil
Greg Perkins
Allen Read
Manuel Rodriguez-Ruiz
Frank Romeo
Kevin Rose
Philip A. Tesoro
Rob Thompson
Michael Washington
Bobby Werner

References

External links
 The Alley Cats

Doo-wop groups